The 2021 Bristol City Council election took place on 6 May 2021 to elect members of Bristol City Council in England. It coincided with nationwide local elections. Voters in the city also voted for the mayor of Bristol, the mayor of West of England and for Avon and Somerset's police and crime commissioner. The election was originally due to take place in May 2020, but was postponed due to the COVID-19 pandemic.

The Labour Party, Conservative Party, Green Party & Liberal Democrats all stood full slates of 70 candidates. There were also eight candidates from the Trade Unionist and Socialist Coalition (TUSC), two independent candidates, and one candidate each from Reform UK, the SDP and Burning Pink.

Turnout was lower than in the 2016 Bristol City Council election, with a citywide turnout of 41.04%. Only four wards had a turnout of more than 50% of the electorate, compared to ten wards in 2016. Hartcliffe and Withywood recorded a turnout of 20.34%, the lowest turnout of any ward since Bristol's move to whole council elections.

Background
Since the 2016 local elections, there have been changes to the political make up of the council. In 2016, Labour briefly lost control of the council after suspending three councillors. Labour regained control of the council later that year after it readmitted them. On 24 May 2018, a by-election was held in Westbury-on-Trym and Henleaze ward, resulting in the Conservatives gaining a seat from the Liberal Democrats. On 22 March 2019, the Eastville councillor Sultan Khan resigned from the Labour Party, but continued to represent the ward as an independent before joining the Liberal Democrats. On 17 July 2019, the Brislington East councillor Tony Carey resigned from the Conservative Party, but continued to represent the ward as an independent before joining the Liberal Democrats A by-election took place in Brislington East on 16 January 2020 after the death of the Labour councillor Mike Langley. The by-election was won by the Labour candidate Tim Rippington. On 23 March 2021, the Labour councillor Jo Sergeant defected to the Green Party.

In preparation for the election, political parties went through their selection processes. The Conservative Party faced controversy after the party deselected Peter Abraham, the council's longest serving councillor who had first been elected in 1966 for the Stockwood ward. The local party did not state a reason for this decision. Labour Party selection processes, which are normally overseen by local party officials, were taken over by paid officials from the South West Labour Party Regional Office, who removed and banned candidates in several key wards, resulting in resignations by local volunteer members. The Labour group in the city saw seventeen of its backbench councillors standing down; twenty councillors, including all of the cabinet, are seeking re-election.

For the candidates for the mayoral election, Marvin Rees was re-selected as Labour's candidate; Sandy Hore-Ruthven was announced as the Green party's candidate, Caroline Gooch from the Liberal Democrats and Samuel Williams was initially selected as the Conservative candidate. Williams subsequently decided to stand down as the Conservative candidate, choosing instead to run in the regional West of England mayoral election. Alastair Watson, a former city councillor, stood for the Conservatives in place of Williams.

Campaign 
Conservative mayoral candidate Williams was critical of Rees's pursuit of Bristol Energy, a council-run energy company and the ambition of constructing underground transport for the city. Both the Conservatives and the Liberal Democrats campaigned to scrap the post of elected mayor.

Council composition
Prior  to the 2021 election, the composition of the council was:

After  the 2021 election, the composition of the council was:

Summary

Election result

The Greens and Labour each won 24 seats out of 70.

|-

Ward results

Ashley

Avonmouth and Lawrence Weston

Bedminster

Bishopston & Ashley Down

Bishopsworth

Brislington East

Brislington West

Central

Clifton

Clifton Down

Cotham

Easton

Eastville

Filwood

Frome Vale

Hartcliffe & Withywood

Henbury & Brentry

Hengrove & Whitchurch Park

Hillfields

Horfield

Hotwells & Harbourside

Knowle

Lawrence Hill

Lockleaze

Redland

Southmead

Southville

St George Central

St George Troopers Hill

St George West

Stockwood

Stoke Bishop

Westbury-on-Trym & Henleaze

Windmill Hill

By-elections

Southmead

Hotwells & Harbourside

At the time of this by-election, both Labour and Green Party held 24 seats on Bristol Council, making them the joint-largest parties. The Green gain in this by-election means the Greens are now the largest group on the council, the first place this has ever happened outside of Brighton and Hove.

References

Bristol City Council election
2020
2020s in Bristol